Roxbury, a community of Lot 6 is a settlement in Prince Edward Island.

Roxbury, Prince Edward Island 

Roxbury, an unincorporated area, is located in Prince County in the western portion of Prince Edward Island, E. of O'Leary. Its precise location is 46'43"N, 64'06"W.

History of the Name 
The official history of the geographic name Roxbury (which can be somewhat technical, we admit): Roxbury (Loc.) was adopted 30 November 1966 on 21I/9.Status confirmed 23 October 1989 on 203–8.

Census Information 
Roxbury falls inside the Statistics Canada census subdivision of Lot 6. We have detailed statistical information available for the Lot 6 census subdivision for the following categories: Education, Ethnicity, Family, Income, Labour Force, Population, and Shelter.

References 
 The Government of Prince Edward Island

Communities in Prince County, Prince Edward Island